Miyanosawa Station (宮の沢駅) is a metro station in Nishi-ku, Sapporo, Hokkaido, Japan. The station number is T01.

The Station is the northern terminus of the Tōzai Line.

Platforms

Surrounding area
Ishiya Chocolate Factory, Shiroi Koibito Park (via underground link near Exit 5)
Shiroi Koibito Football Stadium
Consadole Sapporo Store & Museum
Miyanooka Park
Japan National Route 5 (to Hakodate)
Post Office Miyanosawa
Seiyu Store, Miyanosawa
Hokkaido Bank, Miyanosawa
North Pacific Bank, Miyanosawa

Gallery

External links

 Sapporo Subway Stations)

 

Railway stations in Japan opened in 1999
Railway stations in Sapporo
Sapporo Municipal Subway